Gandhi, My Father is a 2007 Indian biographical drama film by Feroz Abbas Khan. It was produced by Bollywood actor Anil Kapoor, and released on 3 August 2007.

The film stars Darshan Jariwala, Akshaye Khanna, and Bhumika Chawla.   
 
The film explores the troubled relationship between Mahatma Gandhi and his son Harilal Gandhi.

Background
The movie is based upon the biography of Harilal Gandhi, titled Harilal Gandhi: A Life by Chandulal Bhagubhai Dalal. Khan's play, Mahatma vs. Gandhi, while different from this film, had a similar theme which was based on novel by Gujarati author Dinkar Joshi. The movie was shot in South Africa and in several Indian cities including Mumbai and Ahmedabad.

Plot
Gandhi My Father paints the picture of Gandhi's intricate, complex and strained relationship with his son Harilal Gandhi. From the onset, the two had dreams in opposite directions. Harilal's ambition was to study abroad and become a barrister like his father, while Gandhi hoped that his son would join him and fight for his ideals and causes in India.

When Gandhi does not give Harilal the opportunity to study abroad, it comes as a blow to Harilal. He decides to abandon his father’s vision and leaves South Africa for India where he joins his wife Gulab (Bhumika Chawla) and children. He goes back to further his education to earn his diploma but continuously fails and ends in financial ruins. Various plans and schemes to make money fail, leaving the family in poverty. Sick of his failure, Gulab returns to her parents’ house with the children, where she eventually dies from the flu epidemic. Distraught, Harilal turns to alcohol for solace and converts to Islam, only to re-convert to a different sect of Hinduism later on. With political tension heating up, the rift between Gandhi and his eldest son grows until it is beyond repair. Harilal finds it unbearable to live in the enormous shadow of his father. Gandhi is assassinated before the two can reconcile and Harilal attends his father's funeral virtually as a stranger, almost unrecognizable to those around him. A short while later, he passes away, alone and in poverty, having failed to find his own identity.

Cast
Darshan Jariwala - Mahatma Gandhi
Akshaye Khanna - Harilal Gandhi
Bhumika Chawla - Gulab Gandhi
Shefali Shah - Kasturba Gandhi
Vinay Jain -  Kanti Gandhi 
Mona Ambegaonkar- Prostitute

Awards

2007 National Film Awards
Special Jury Award - Feroz Abbas Khan & Anil Kapoor
Best Screenplay - Feroz Abbas Khan
Best Supporting Actor - Darshan Jariwala

2008 Zee Cine Awards
Critics Award (Best Film) - Anil Kapoor
Critics Award (Best Actress) - Shefali Shah

2007 Asia Pacific Screen Awards

Best Screenplay - Feroz Abbas Khan

See also
List of artistic depictions of Mohandas Karamchand Gandhi

Notes

External links

BollySpice's Gandhi My Father movie review
Official Website of Hindi Movie Gandhi my Father at Eros Entertainment

Gandhi, My Father at Yahoo! Movies
Chatterji, Shoma A. In the name of the father. Deccan Herald, 22 July 2007.

Films about Mahatma Gandhi
Films set in the Indian independence movement
2007 films
2000s Hindi-language films
Indian biographical films
Films featuring a Best Supporting Actor National Film Award-winning performance
Films shot in Gujarat
Films whose writer won the Best Original Screenplay National Film Award
Special Jury Award (feature film) National Film Award winners